Coatham Mundeville is a village in the borough of Darlington and the ceremonial county of 
County Durham, England. It is situated a short distance from Brafferton, on the A167 between Newton Aycliffe and Darlington.

References

External links

Villages in County Durham
Places in the Borough of Darlington
Places in the Tees Valley